John Eric Calderon Osorio is an urban music artist known as John Eric La Roca.

Eric's music has been included as part of the soundtrack of the movie "Feel the Noise", and of the video games Grand Theft Auto IV and FIFA 07. He is known for the single "Raka Taka Taka", and his collaboration on "Na de Na" by Angel & Khriz, was positioned as #86 in the list of 100 best reggaeton songs, published by Rolling Stone.

Musical career 
From an early age, Eric demonstrated his inclination for the reggaeton genre. At the age of 11, it was where he began to compose his own musical themes. His first steps would be taken at local parties and community centers, making himself known to many emerging music producers of the time, and recording in 1995 in some "underground" productions.

In the year 2000, he signed a contract under the Guatauba Productions label, thus becoming part of the Guatauba XXX album, where Eric performed his great hit "Rakataka", boosting his career and thus leading him to collaborate in productions such as MVP of the producer Gocho, Mas Flow by Luny Tunes and Noriega, Contra la corriente by Noriega, Voltaje / AC by Julio Voltio, Los Bandoleros, produced by Don Omar, among others.

In 2005, Eric's recording repertoire was joined by his first production as a soloist titled "Peso Completo", under the Jiggiri Records label of Tego Calderon and White Lion, where he had the collaboration of singers such as Ángel & Khriz, Alberto Stylee, Tego Calderón, Voltio, Zion and Lennox, and even surpassed 100,000 copies sold, and debuted at #45 on the Billboard's Top Latin Albums chart and #11 on Billboard's Latin Rhythm Albums. The music producers were Mambo Kings, DJ Nesty, Nely, DJ Barbosa, Urba and Monserrate, Naldo and Luny Tunes.

The single "Tembleque" entered Billboard's Hot Latin Tracks list, and was part of the soundtrack of the film Feel the Noise, produced by Jennifer López. In that same year, she incorporated her record label Peso Completo Records, with her own recording studio.

In the following years, Eric participated in various productions such as La calle Vol. 1, Los cocorocos, La Iglesia de la calle by Gerardo, Salsatón by Andy Montañez, El Pentágono by Revol and Don Omar, among others. The following year, he announced his second recording project entitled "Borrón y cuenta nueva", which would be released under his label and promoted with the single "Bumpea", which featured an official video featuring Cirilo and Julio Voltio. The single "Taka tiki taka" was also released. However, the album was not officially released.

In 2009, on the album Showtime in collaboration with Ángel & Khriz and Gocho, they composed the song "Na de na", which was nominated at the Billboard Latin Music Awards and awarded at ASCAP for composition as Tropical Song of the Year. Rolling Stone placed it in position 87, within the 100 best reggaeton songs of all time. It was also included in the video games Grand Theft Auto IV and FIFA 07 as part of the soundtrack.

In 2020, DJ Bryan Flow remixed "Raka Taka Taka" and achieved success on TikTok and other digital platforms. Later, Duars Entertainment, Rauw Alejandro's label, proposed to Eric to make the official version with his rerecorded voices. The position that this new version achieved in Billboard Argentina Hot 100 was #89.

Discography 

 2005: Peso Completo

References

External links 
 

1983 births
Living people
People from Río Piedras, Puerto Rico
Puerto Rican rappers